Jack Driscoll may refer to:

Jack Driscoll (American football) (born 1997), American football offensive lineman
Jack Driscoll (character), a fictional character in the King Kong franchise

See also
John Driscoll (disambiguation)